The Israeli Basketball Association (IBBA) is the official organization of professional basketball in Israel.

History
The organization oversees the regulation of the sport, team and player registration, rules of the game, various official (such as referees and statisticians) certification, and the National team. It is responsible for sanctioning official leagues at various levels, issuing league schedules, and certifying match results. The IBA also handles associating with international bodies such as FIBA and Euroleague Basketball (who organizes the EuroLeague).

In 2017 Amos Frishman was the Chairman of the Israel Basketball Association professional committee.

See also
 Israeli Basketball Premier League
 Liga Leumit (basketball)
 Liga Artzit (basketball)
 Israeli Basketball State Cup
 Basketball in Israel

References

Further reading
Safsal - The Israeli Basketball Portal 
Eurobasket Israel Report
International Basketball - Israel Resources
 Maccabi Haifa Heat and Maccabi Tel Aviv broadcasts for North America

External links
 Official website 

Basketball
Basketball in Israel
Basketball governing bodies in Europe